Kranti is a 1981 Indian historical drama film, produced and directed by Manoj Kumar, with the story and screenplay written by Salim–Javed. It stars an ensemble cast, consisting of Dilip Kumar in the title role along with Manoj Kumar, Shashi Kapoor, Shatrughan Sinha, Hema Malini, Parveen Babi in pivotal roles. The film also marked the return of Dilip Kumar after a four-year hiatus. It ranks among the top 10 highest grossing Indian films of all time, when adjusted for ticket-price inflation. It was one of the most expensive Indian films of the time and it went on to become the highest grossing Indian film of the 1980s decade by a distance, when adjusted for inflation. Kranti is the biggest patriotic hit ever seen in India. It was the second highest grossing Indian film ever behind Sholay (1975) at the time of its release. However, it did higher business than Sholay in its original run. It grossed ₹20 crore as compared to ₹15 crore of Sholay in the original run. Sholay did exceptionally well in re-runs earning more profit in the meanwhile period.

At the time of release it was the fastest earner of all time setting first run records in practically all circuits barring Mumbai and South. It celebrated a silver jubilee in 26 centres and even in places like Mirzapur (UP) and Junagadh (Gujarat) where jubilees were very rare. There are hardly ten films in history that are estimated to have celebrated jubilees in over 25 centres. The craze of the film was such that in places like Delhi, Rajasthan, UP and Haryana there were shops selling Kranti T-shirts, jackets, vests and even underwear. This film celebrated golden jubilee in many centres across India. It ran for 67 weeks straight in the theatres including a theatre where it was housefull for 96 days.

The collections in all major centres of UP did not see a drop even weeks after its release. The collections after ten weeks in places like Agra, Gorakhpur and Varanasi were still competing with new releases. Kranti grossed 1.25 crore nett in Delhi / UP in ten weeks and then went on to do over 3 crore nett in its full run and before Hum Aapke Hain Kaun..! released in 1994 (marking major changes in business of films), there were only three films in history to cross 3 crore nett in Delhi / UP. The film was finally declared a Golden Jubilee Hit. Kranti is widely regarded as a cult film.

Synopsis
The film takes place in the 19th Century British India and is the story of the fight for independence from the British between 1825 and 1875. The film tells the story of men that lead the war against British Rule: Sanga (Dilip Kumar), Bharat (Manoj Kumar) known as Kranti, a prince (Shashi Kapoor) and a freedom fighter (Shatrughan Sinha). Sanga is an honest and dedicated employee in the kingdom of Ramgarh, owing allegiance and loyalty to no one except Raja Laxman Singh. When Laxman Singh conditionally permits the British to use the port for trading purposes, Sangha finds out that the British are taking out gold and jewellery and bringing in ammunition, and puts a stop to this. He goes to report this outrage to Laxman Singh, only to find him stabbed to death. Sanga is charged with treason and of killing Laxman Singh. Sentenced to death, he escapes and forms a group of revolutionaries who have only one goal - to drive the British out of India. This group multiplies into several armies, all united with one slogan - an Independent India, also known as Kranti. The film is known for a nude scene of Parveen Babi.

Cast

Dilip Kumar as Sanga
Manoj Kumar as Bharat
Shashi Kapoor as Shakti
Shatrughan Sinha as Karim Khan
Hema Malini as Rajkumari Meenakshi
Parveen Babi as Sureeli
Nirupa Roy as Radha
Pradeep Kumar as Shamsher Singh
Prem Chopra as Shambhu Singh
Kishore Kapoor as Sir Thomas 
Madan Puri as Sher Singh
Shashikala as Rani Charumati
Sulochana Latkar as Rama, Servant of Rani Charumati
Preeti Ganguly as Sureeli's Friend
Sarika as Sheetal
Sudhir Dalvi as Bheema
Kunal Goswami as Bharat & Meenakshi's Son
Agha as Sanga's Kranti Group Member 
Birbal as Sanga's Kranti Group Member 
Paintal as Bharat's Kranti Group Member
Bhagwan as Allah Rakha
Manmohan as Darmiyan Singh
Tom Alter as British Officer
P. Jairaj as Maharaj Laxman Singh
Dheeraj Kumar as Prince
Gurbachan Singh as British Indian Soldier

Soundtrack
The music is scored by Laxmikant Pyarelal and lyrics written by Santosh Anand. The music was popular with some hit songs like "Zindagi Ki Na Toote Ladi" and "Chana Jor Garam".  Laxmikant Pyarelal used famous singers Kishore Kumar, Lata Mangeshkar, Mohammed Rafi, Manna Dey, Mahendra Kapoor, Shailender Singh and Nitin Mukesh to sing for the actors.

Box office notes
 Net gross of approximately Rs.10-crore.
 The top-grossing Indian film of 1981.
 It ran for 67 weeks in theaters.
 It was a Golden Jubilee HIT, and entailed good profits for all Indian distributors despite a heavy price tag (2 Crore) attached. It was among the costliest Indian movie ever at that time with many estimates of it being the costliest.

See also
 Naya Daur
 Saat Hindustani
 Lagaan
 Pukar
 Anand Math

References

External links 
 

1981 films
Films set in the British Empire
1980s Hindi-language films
Films set in the Indian independence movement
Films scored by Laxmikant–Pyarelal
Films with screenplays by Salim–Javed
Urdu-language Indian films
1980s Urdu-language films
Films directed by Manoj Kumar